Old Cathedral may refer to:

A colloquial name for the Basilica of St. Louis, King of France
Old Cathedral, Brescia
Old Cathedral of Coimbra
Old Cathedral of Cuenca
Old Cathedral of Managua
Old Cathedral of Rio de Janeiro
Old Cathedral, Salamanca
Old Saint Mary's Cathedral
St. Francis Xavier Cathedral and Library, locally known as the Old Cathedral